Askham is a civil parish in the Bassetlaw District of Nottinghamshire, England.  The parish contains five listed buildings that are recorded in the National Heritage List for England.  Of these, two are listed at Grade II*, the middle of the three grades, and the others are at Grade II, the lowest grade.  The parish contains the village of Askham and the surrounding countryside.  All the listed buildings are in the village, and consist of two houses, a church, a public house, and a group of farm buildings.


Key

Buildings

References

Citations

Sources

 

Lists of listed buildings in Nottinghamshire